The East Coast Collegiate Hockey Association (ECCHA) was an ACHA college ice hockey conference in the Southeast region of the United States. 

The ECCHA was created in August of 2001 as Blue Ridge Hockey Conference or BRHC by eight collegiate hockey programs in Virginia and North Carolina. The BRHC has advanced four of its members to the ACHA National Tournament since 2003. 

As of the summer of 2017, the BRHC was restructured to form the East Coast Collegiate Hockey Association with the intent to improve the quality of its brand of ACHA Division III hockey in the mid-Atlantic and Southern region. The league transitioned into the ACCHL for the start of the 2019-2020 season.

Teams
ECCHA Atlantic Division North
American University
Northern Virginia Community College
Marymount University
College of William & Mary
ECCHA Atlantic Division South
Old Dominion University
University of Richmond
East Carolina University
Appalachian State
ECCHA Colonial Division
Christopher Newport University
College of Charleston
Coastal Carolina University
Radford University
Virginia  Commonwealth University
The Citadel

Former teams
The last year as BRHC, in 2017, conference's membership had tripled since 2007, making it the largest collegiate hockey conference in the United States. 

Colonial Division

Atlantic Division- North Region

Atlantic Division- South Region

Conference champions
The championship tournament is held every year on the third weekend of February. In 2015 it was held at Chilled Ponds in Chesapeake, Virginia.

Colonial Division

See also
American Collegiate Hockey Association
List of ice hockey leagues

References

External links
 

ACHA Division 3 conferences